Fjeldstad is a Norwegian surname. Notable Norwegians with the surname include:

Erik Fjeldstad (born 1944), ice hockey player
Jack Fjeldstad (1915–2000), actor and stage producer
Lise Fjeldstad (born 1939), actress
Øivin Fjeldstad (1903–1983), conductor and violinist
Øivin Skappel Fjeldstad (born 1936), banker and politician
Sveinung Fjeldstad (born 1978), footballer
Torill Fjeldstad (born 1958), alpine skier

Norwegian-language surnames